Jarno Tuunainen (born 5 November 1977) is a Finnish footballer who currently plays for MyPa in Finnish Veikkausliiga.

References
 Guardian Football
 Profile at veikkausliiga.com

1977 births
Living people
Finnish footballers
FC Jokerit players
FC KooTeePee players
Atlantis FC players
Myllykosken Pallo −47 players
Veikkausliiga players
Association football defenders
Footballers from Helsinki